Darren John Broom (born 16 September 1985) is a New Zealand cricketer. Broom is a right-handed batsman and very occasional right-arm medium bowler. A brother of Neil Broom, he played Twenty20 and one day cricket for Canterbury and Otago. In the Hawke Cup, Broom played in North Otago's successful challenge against Manawatu in 2010, scoring a century in the second innings, helping them take the Cup to Oamaru for the first time.

Broom was born at Christchurch and educated at Christchurch Boys' High School.

References

External links
 

1985 births
New Zealand cricketers
Canterbury cricketers
Otago cricketers
Cricketers from Christchurch
Living people